The Olin Business School is one of seven academic schools at Washington University in St. Louis. Founded in 1917, the business school was renamed for entrepreneur John M. Olin in 1988. The school offers BSBA, Master of Business Administration (MBA), MS in Supply Chain Management, MS in Finance (Corporate Finance and Investments, Wealth and Asset Management, Quantitative Finance, Global Finance), Masters in Accounting, MS in Business Analytics (Customer Analytics, Accounting Analytics, Supply Chain Analytics, Financial Technology Analytics, Healthcare Analytics, Talent Analytics), MS in Leadership, Executive MBA, Doctor of Business in Finance (DBA) and PhD degrees. In 2002, an Executive MBA program was established in Shanghai, in cooperation with Fudan University and in 2017, along with IIT-Bombay (Shailesh J. Mehta School of Management) started an EMBA program in India.

The Olin Business School includes the  Simon Hall, whose 1986 construction was largely funded by a gift from John E. Simon; Knight and Bauer Halls, whose 2014 construction was largely funded by gifts from Charles F. And Joanne Knight and George and Carol Bauer; and the Charles F. Knight Executive Education and Conference Center, all on the Danforth Campus.

Olin has more than 20,000 alumni across the world.

On July 1, 2009, the school took over management of the Brookings Institute's executive management program.

Programs

BSBA Program
At Olin, undergraduate students are admitted directly into the BSBA program as freshmen.

To graduate, students must complete a minimum of 120 units of coursework. 40% of classes must be outside the areas of business. Students can choose from eight different business majors: Accounting, Economics and Strategy, Entrepreneurship, Finance, Healthcare Management, Marketing, Leadership and Strategic Management, and Operations and Supply Chain Management. Olin students can also minor in International Business, the Business of the Arts, the Business of Entertainment, or the Business of Sports Management.

Students declare their business administration major (or majors) during their sophomore year. Students can also earn a second major or minor from one of the university's other schools, such as the College of Arts & Sciences, School of Engineering & Applied Science, or Sam Fox School of Design & Visual Arts.

Non-business students from other WUSTL schools also can minor in the following business fields: Accounting, Business Economics, Business of Sports, Business of the Arts, Entrepreneurship, Finance, General Business, Healthcare Management, International Business, Leadership, Marketing, Operations and Supply Chain Management, and Strategy.

MBA Program
Olin has four main rounds and after June they have rolling admissions.

Olin's MBA program was named the #4 global MBA program for women in the Financial Times (2018). In 2019, the class reached near-gender parity with 49% female students. In October 2019, an Inc. Magazine ranking powered by Poets&Quants ranked Olin as the #1 MBA program in the world for entrepreneurship. In January 2020, Olin was named the Poets&Quants MBA Program of 2019 as a result of a series of radical changes to the program focusing on global immersion.

Students in the full-time MBA program experience a global immersion for the first semester of their experience. Students begin with an orientation in St. Louis before spending time in Washington, DC learning about the intersection of business and policy. They then spend time in Barcelona, consulting with local wineries, before spending two weeks in Shanghai studying entrepreneurship and the foundations of retail management and supply chain.

The MBA curriculum requires completion of 67 credit hours, nearly two-thirds of which are elective courses selected by the student. The fall semester of year one focuses on critical thinking, leadership, career strategy, and the major functional areas of business. During the spring semester of year one and throughout year two, students take mostly elective courses of their choosing, often following the guidelines of platforms and concentration areas that help students navigate the curriculum toward their career goals. Platforms offered include:
 Consulting
 Corporate Finance and Investments
 Entrepreneurship
 Marketing
 Operations and Supply Chain Management

Elective courses include semester-long (3 credit) courses, six week "mini" (1.5 credit) courses, and work-study positions. Olin MBAs can also take up to nine credits of approved coursework from other graduate programs at Washington University.

Exchange Programs
MBA students can choose to study one semester at Manchester Business School in the United Kingdom, Hong Kong University of Science & Technology in Hong Kong; Otto Beisheim Graduate School of Management at WHU-Koblenz in Koblenz, Germany; École Management de Lyon (EM Lyon) in Lyon, Paris Dauphine University, France; the Institute for Advanced Studies in Administration (IESA) in Caracas, Venezuela; ESADE (Escuela Superior De Administracion Y Direccion De Empresas) in Barcelona, Spain; Bocconi University in Milan, Italy or the Indian Institute of Management Ahmedabad and Indian Institute of Management Calcutta in India.

Executive Programs
The school's Executive Programs group, consisting of Executive MBA and Executive Education, is located in the Charles F. Knight Executive Education Center on the Danforth Campus. The school also maintains Executive MBA programs in Shanghai (at Fudan University), and Mumbai (at Indian Institute of Technology in Bombay, Shailesh J. Mehta School of Management).

Specialized Masters Programs
Specialized Masters business degrees can typically be completed in three semesters. Four programs — Master of Science in Supply Chain Management (MSSCM), Master of Science in Business Analytics (MSA), Master of Science in Finance-Wealth and Asset Management (MSFWAM), and Master of Science in Finance-Quantitative Finance (MSFQ) — hold STEM (Science, Technology, Engineering and Mathematics) designations. The Master of Accounting (MACC) can be structured to meet CPA exam eligibility requirements.

Doctoral Program
There are usually 50 students enrolled in the Ph.D program. A DBA in finance also is offered for individuals pursuing applied research in corporations, banks, government and consulting.

Overall Enrollment (2018)

Resources

Kopolow Business Library
The Kopolow Business Library offers Dow Jones Interactive, Lexis/Nexis, InfoTrac, and ABI, as well as databases provided by Moody's, Standard & Poor's, Hoover's, and Disclosure. The library also receives real-time stock and other market information through the Bloomberg and Bridge Information systems. It holds around 30,000 books and subscribes to more than 400 business journals, magazines, and newspapers.

Research centers
 Bauer Leadership Center - supports Olin Business School's efforts to develop "values-based leaders".
 Boeing Center for Supply Chain Innovation
 Wells Fargo Advisors Center for Finance and Accounting Research - supports collaborative research with finance and accounting industry by encouraging faculty and students to work more closely with companies. 
Koch Center for Family Business - engages the next generation of family business leaders and connects them to resources they need to succeed.
 Center for Customer Analytics and Big Data – offers opportunities for faculty, students, and companies to collaborate on analysis and research.
 Center for Research in Economics and Strategy – supports scientific research to advance understanding of firms and markets.

Notable alumni

John H. Biggs (PhD): former CEO of TIAA-CREF
 Steve Fossett (MBA 1968): options trader, balloonist, and adventurer
 Sam Fox (BSBA 1951): founder, chairman, CEO, and owner of Harbour Group Industries
 Avram Glazer (BSBA 1982): Chairman of Manchester United
 Edward Mueller (MBA): president and CEO of Qwest Communications
 David Peacock (MBA): president of Anheuser-Busch
 William Shaw (MBA 1972): president and COO of Marriott International Inc.
 Jack C. Taylor (student through 1944): founder of Enterprise Rent-A-Car; no. 14 on Forbes 400 Richest Americans in 2006
 Jim Weddle (AB 1977, MBA): managing partner at Edward Jones Investments
 John B. Whyte (attended two years in 1950s): Developer of Fire Island Pines, New York
 George Zimmer (AB 1970): founder of Men's Wearhouse

References

External links
Inc Magazine Names Olin #1 MBA Program for Entrepreneurship
Olin Business School Leads in Gender Parity
Poets & Quants Names Olin #2 Business School For Undergrads
 BusinessWeek Ranks Olin MBAs #2 in Career Placement, 2009
 Business School Concentrations: Is More Better?
 USA Today 2008 story on the Olin School Class of 1998
 Moreton named associate dean at Olin Business School
 Industry Perspectives: Using Video to Communicate Change for Business Success
 CEO Salaries: What is the Average Salary of a CEO?
 Olin Business School Official Website

Washington University in St. Louis
Business schools in Missouri
Educational institutions established in 1917
Washington University in St. Louis campus
University subdivisions in Missouri
1917 establishments in Missouri